Funnel-web spider refers to many different species of spider, particularly those that spin a web in the shape of a funnel:

 spiders in the family Agelenidae, including
 Hololena curta
 funnel-web tarantulas (suborder Mygalomorphae):
 family Atracidae, Australian funnel-web spiders, some of which produce venom dangerous to humans, including
 Sydney funnel-web spider (Atrax robustus)
 family Dipluridae
 family Hexathelidae
 family Nemesiidae
 family Macrothelidae, sole genus Macrothele
 family Mecicobothriidae, dwarf tarantulas or sheet funnel-web spiders
 family Porrhothelidae, sole genus Porrhothele

Set index articles on spiders